The 1981–82 FIRA Trophy was the 22nd edition of a European rugby union championship for national teams.

The first division number of teams was reduced to five teams, instead of the previous six. The tournament was won by France, with three wins and a single draw, in the final game, a 10–10 draw with Soviet Union abroad. France only awarded caps in their 17–9 win over the strong side of Romania. Italy finished in 2nd place, with two wins, a draw and a loss, ahead of Romania, who had two wins and two losses. Soviet Union finished in a disappointing 4th place, not being able to win a single game.

First division 
Table

No relegations

Results

Second division 
Table

Morocco Promoted to division 1

Tunisia relegated to division 3

Results

Third division 
Table

Sweden promoted to division 2

Results

Bibliography 
 Francesco Volpe, Valerio Vecchiarelli (2000), 2000 Italia in Meta, Storia della nazionale italiana di rugby dagli albori al Sei Nazioni, GS Editore (2000) .
 Francesco Volpe, Paolo Pacitti (Author), Rugby 2000, GTE Gruppo Editorale (1999).

References

External links
 FIRA-AER official website

1981–82 in European rugby union
1981-82
1981 rugby union tournaments for national teams
1982 rugby union tournaments for national teams